The 2021 MBC Entertainment Awards (Korean: 2021 MBC 방송연예대상) presented by Munhwa Broadcasting Corporation (MBC),  took place on December 29, 2021, at MBC Public Hall in Sangam-dong, Mapo-gu, Seoul. It was hosted by Jun Hyun-moo, Lee Sang-yi and Kim Se-jeong, and aired on December 29, 2021, at 20.45 (KST). Yoo Jae-suk won the Grand Prize for Hangout with Yoo for second year in a row.

Nominations and winners

Presenters

Performances

See also 
 2021 KBS Entertainment Awards
 2021 SBS Entertainment Awards

References

External links 

MBC TV original programming
MBC Entertainment Awards
2021 television awards
2021 in South Korea
2021 in South Korean television